Eugene John "Scrapiron" Young (June 21, 1903 – January 7, 1987) was a writer, professional trainer, coach, and attorney.

He was born in Dover, Ohio on June 21, 1903, to an Italian mother and an English father. His father died when Eugene was six-years-old. He worked eight hours a day at a steel mill, and was still able to put himself through high school, graduating in a record time; two years. He was also able to still play school sports, being a member of the football, basketball, and baseball teams. In the fall of 1923 he entered into the University of Notre Dame, and broke his leg during tryouts for the football team, but went on to join the track team; breaking the school's 1- and 2- mile records. In June, 1927, he graduated from Notre Dame's Law School, receiving the Byron V. Kanaley Award (athlete with highest scholastic average), and Magna cum laude honors.  In the fall of 1927, on the advice of Knute Rockne, he accepted the Athletic Director and head coaching job at St. Catherine's High School (Racine, Wisconsin), Racine, Wisconsin, and taught Algebra and Physical education. As football coach (22-5-3) he led his team to an undefeated season in 1929. As basketball coach (60-17) he led the team to 3 consecutive invitations to the National Catholic interscholastic Basketball Tournament.  On February 9, 1930, he married Mary Agnes Pfaffl at St. Patrick's Roman Catholic Church (Racine, Wisconsin).  In the fall of 1930, Knute Rockne hired Scrapiron to be Notre Dame's first head athletic trainer. He held that position for 21 years, quitting in 1945 to spend time on his pecan farm in Covington, LA. There, he started a boys' camp for religious order. Later that year he was hired as head trainer of the Detroit Lions, and in 1946 hired by the Chicago Rockets.  In 1947, he was hired by the University of San Francisco as their athletic trainer. In 1951, his book "With Rockne at Notre Dame" was published by G. P. Putnam's Sons.

He died on January 7, 1987, in Shawnee, OK, and was buried at Holy Cross Cemetery, Racine, WI.

References

1903 births
1987 deaths
Notre Dame Law School alumni

Lawyers by century
Athletic trainers
Ohio-related lists
Track and field athletes
University of Notre Dame alumni
University of Notre Dame-related lists
University of Notre Dame faculty
Detroit Lions coaches
Detroit Lions personnel
Athletic training
University of San Francisco faculty